DeepBurner is a CD/DVD authoring program made by Astonsoft which supports CD-R, CD-RW, DVD-R, DVD-RW, DVD+R, DVD+RW and DVD-RAM. Additionally it can create and burn ISO images. It is available in a free or pro version. It is still maintained as of 2020.

References

External links

Optical disc authoring software
Windows CD/DVD writing software
Windows-only software